Hinde House School is a mixed all-through school for pupils aged 3 to 16. The school is located in the Shiregreen area of Sheffield, South Yorkshire, England.

Hinde House was the first state-funded all-through school for both primary and secondary school education in the country. In 2005, the school moved to a new building and expanded its primary provision in 2012. In July 2013, the school converted to academy status and is now part of the Brigantia Learning Trust which includes the nearby Concord Junior School and Wincobank Nursery and Infant School.

The school mainly admits pupils from the Darnall, Shiregreen, Tinsley and Wincobank areas of Sheffield, and offers a range of GCSEs as programmes of study for pupils.

The school is built on the site of the former Hinde House Secondary Modern School, dating from 1956, which amalgamated with Owler Lane Intermediate School in 1963 to become Hinde House Comprehensive School.

Notable former pupils
Bernard Hogan-Howe, Commissioner of Police of the Metropolis 2011-2017 (when Hinde House Comprehensive)
Steve Mackey, Bass guitarist for Pulp (when Hinde House Comprehensive)

References

External links
Hinde House School (primary phase) official website
Hinde House School (secondary phase) official website

Secondary schools in Sheffield
Primary schools in Sheffield
Academies in Sheffield